The Kosovo Transitional Council,, was an advisory body that existed in Kosovo between July 1999 and November 2001 during the period that the United Nations was directly responsible for the governance of Kosovo. The council was replaced by the Assembly of Kosovo following elections held in November 2001.

First transitional council (July 1999 to January 2000)
A twelve member transitional council was formed on 16 July 1999. Chaired by the Special Representative of the Secretary-General, the council was the described as being the highest political consultative body within the United Nations administration. Its purpose was to offer the main political parties and ethnic communities in Kosovo an opportunity for direct input into the decision-making process of UNMIK. The first meeting of the council was at the former MUP headquarters in Pristina and subsequent meetings were held at UNMIK headquarters.

Membership
The membership of the first transitional council was as follows:

Second transitional council (January 2000 to November 2001)
In January 2000, Joint Interim Administrative Structure was established. The membership of the transitional council was expanded to 35 and it assumed the role of a deliberative assembly. A transitional cabinet, known as the Interim Administrative Council, with eight members, four of which were appointed by UNMIK and four by political parties represented in the transitional council was also established at this time.

Structure
The council had 36 members and would meet on a weekly basis. It had four committees, each made up of 15 members; Tolerance and Protection of Local Communities, Detainees and Missing Persons, Economic Affairs and Education.

Membership

The membership of the second transitional council was as follows:

Members of the Interim Administrative Council
Hashim Thaçi - Democratic Party of Kosovo
Ibrahim Rugova - Democratic League of Kosovo
Rexhep Qosja - United Democratic Movement
Rada Trajković - Serbian National Council of Kosovo and Metohija

Representatives of ethnic Albanian political parties
Kole Berisha - Democratic League of Kosovo
Gjergj Dedaj - Liberal Party of Kosovo
Feti Grapci - Republican Party of Kosovo
Fatmir Limaj - Democratic Party of Kosovo
Vacant - National Movement for Liberation of Kosovo
Januz Salihaj - Parliamentary Party of Kosovo
Mehmet Hajrizi - United Democratic Movement
Nazmi Halimi - Albanian Christian Democratic Party of Kosovo
Lazer Krasniqi - Albanian Christian Democratic Party of Kosovo
Kaqusha Jashari - Social Democratic Party of Kosovo
Luleta Pula-Beriqi - Social Democratic Party of Kosovo

Representatives of ethnic minority  communities
Randjel Nojkic - SNC Serbian National Council of Kosovo and Metohija (Serb)
Dragan Velic - SNC Serbian National Council of Kosovo and Metohija (Serb)
Vacant - Serbian National Council - Mitrovica (Serb)
Numan Balic - Party of Democratic Action (Kosovo) (Bosniac)
Asim Puljic - Zaman NGO (Bosniac)
Sezair Shaipi - Turkish People's Party (Turk)
Vacant - Additional Turkish representative (Turk)
Hadji Zulfi Mergja - Roma community leader (Roma)

Representatives of religious communities
Rexhep Boja - Muslim community
Bishop Mark Sopi - Roman Catholic Church
Father Sava Janjic - Serbian Orthodox Church

Representatives of civil society
Shukrie Rexha - Association of Political Prisoners
Iak Mita - Mother Teresa Society
Hajrullahu Gorani - Association of Trade Unions
Pajazit Nushi - Council for the Defence of Human Rights and Freedoms
Sevdije Ahmeti - Centre for the Protection of Women and Children
Blerim Shala - Zeri newspaper (representing publishers)
Sonja Nikolic - Civic House/Radio Contact
Feriz Krasniqi - Former Rector of Pristina University
Ylber Hysa - Kosova Action for Civic Initiatives
Ismail Kastrati - Kosovo Chamber of Commerce and Industry

See also
United Nations Administered Kosovo
United Nations Interim Administration Mission in Kosovo
Joint Interim Administrative Structure
Provisional Institutions of Self-Government

References

Government of Kosovo
Politics of Kosovo
1999 establishments in Kosovo